Ca-bau-kan, also known as The Courtesan, is a 2002 Indonesian romantic drama film, directed by Nia Dinata, and starring Niniek L. Karim, Ferry Salim and Lola Amaria. It was distributed by Kalyana Shira Film and released on February 7, 2002 in Jakarta. The film was screened at the 2003 Palm Springs International Film Festival.

Cast
Ferry Salim as Tan Peng Liang 
Lola Amaria as Siti Noerhajati also known as Tinung 
Niniek L. Karim as Giok Lan 
Irgi A. Fahrenzi as Tan soen Bie 
Alex Komang as Rahardjo Soetardjo 
Robby Tumewu as Thio Boen Hiap 
Ananda George as Max Awuy 
Tutie Kirana as Jeng Tut 
Henky Solaiman as Liem Kiem Jang 
Lulu Dewayanti as Saodah 
Chossy Latu as Nyoo Tek Hong 
Alvin Adam as Timothy Wu 
Maria Oentoe as Tan Peng Liang's mother 
Billy Glenn as Tja Wan Sen 
Joseph Ginting as Oey Eng Goan 
Moelyono as Tan Peng Liang Tamim 
Yongki Komaladi as Kwee Tjwie Sien

References

External links
 

2002 films
2000s Indonesian-language films
Films about adoption
Films shot in Indonesia
2002 romantic drama films
Indonesian romantic drama films
Films based on Indonesian novels
2002 directorial debut films